Blair Tugman is an American mixed martial artist currently competing in the Lightweight division of Bellator MMA. A professional competitor since 2007, he has also competed for CES MMA.

Mixed martial arts career

Bellator MMA
Tugman faced A.J. McKee at Bellator 182 on August 25, 2017. He lost via unanimous decision.

Mixed martial arts record

|-
|Win
|align=center| 11–7
|Shane Manley
|Decision (unanimous)
|CES MMA 51
|
|align=center|3
|align=center|5:00
|Lincoln, Rhode Island, United States
|
|-
|Loss
|align=center| 10–7
|A.J. McKee
|Decision (unanimous)
|Bellator 182
|
|align=center|3
|align=center|5:00
|Verona, New York, United States
|
|-
| Win
| align=center| 10–6
| Tom English
| Submission (rear-naked choke)
| Bellator 178
| 
| align=center| 3
| align=center| 4:54
| Uncasville, Connecticut, United States
| 
|-
| Win
| align=center| 9–6
| Walter Smith-Cotito
| Decision (unanimous)
| Bellator 163
| 
| align=center| 3
| align=center| 5:00
| Uncasville, Connecticut, United States
|
|-
| Win
| align=center| 8–6
| Jay Perrin
| Decision (split)
| Bellator 153
| 
| align=center| 3
| align=center| 5:00
| Uncasville, Connecticut, United States
| 
|-
| Loss
| align=center| 7–6
| Kin Moy
| Submission (triangle choke)
| Bellator 140
| 
| align=center| 3
| align=center| 3:01
| Uncasville, Connecticut, United States
|
|-
| Win
| align=center| 7–5
| Marvin Maldonado
| Decision (unanimous)
| Bellator 134: The British Invasion
| 
| align=center| 3
| align=center| 5:00
| Uncasville, Connecticut, United States
| 
|-
| Win
| align=center| 6–5
| Brandon Fleming
| Decision (unanimous)
| Bellator 123
| 
| align=center| 3
| align=center| 5:00
| Uncasville, Connecticut, United States
| 
|-
| Loss
| align=center| 5–5
| Andre Soukhamthath
| Decision (unanimous)
| CES MMA: New Blood
| 
| align=center| 3
| align=center| 5:00
| Lincoln, Rhode Island, United States
| 
|-
| Loss
| align=center| 5–4
| John McLaughlin
| Decision (unanimous)
| Bellator 39
| 
| align=center| 3
| align=center| 5:00
| Uncasville, Connecticut, United States
| 
|-
| Win
| align=center| 5–3
| Todd Sweeney
| Submission (rear-naked choke)
| CES MMA: Cage of Horrors
| 
| align=center| 1
| align=center| 0:46
| Mashantucket, Connecticut, United States
| 
|-
| Loss
| align=center| 4–3
| Jessie Riggleman
| Decision (unanimous)
| RIE 1: Battle at the Burg
| 
| align=center| 3
| align=center| 5:00
| Harrisonburg, Virginia, United States
| 
|-
| Loss
| align=center| 4-2
| Steve Deangelis
| Submission (guillotine choke)
| BCX 4: Battle Cage Xtreme 4
| 
| align=center| 2
| align=center| 1:00
| Atlantic City, New Jersey, United States
| 
|-
| Win
| align=center| 4-1
| Josh Spearman
| Submission (rear-naked choke)
| ICE Fighter: Dead Man Walking
| 
| align=center| 1
| align=center| 2:18
| Worcester, Massachusetts, United States
| 
|-
| Win
| align=center| 3-1
| Jason Frawley
| Submission (rear-naked choke)
| BCX 3: Battle Cage Xtreme 3
| 
| align=center| 1
| align=center| 1:01
| Atlantic City, New Jersey, United States
| 
|-
| Loss
| align=center| 2–1
| Tim Troxell
| Decision (unanimous)
| BCX 2: Battle Cage Xtreme 2
| 
| align=center| 3
| align=center| 5:00
| Atlantic City, New Jersey, United States
| 
|-
| Win
| align=center| 2–0
| Dan Hawley
| Decision (unanimous)
| Bodog Fight: Alvarez vs. Lee
| 
| align=center| 3
| align=center| 5:00
| Trenton, New Jersey, United States
| 
|-
| Win
| align=center| 1–0
| Glenn Ortiz
| Decision (unanimous)
| EC 78: Extreme Challenge 78
| 
| align=center| 3
| align=center| 5:00
| Asbury Park, New Jersey, United States
|

See also
List of current Bellator fighters
List of male mixed martial artists

References

External links
 
 
 
 
 

American male mixed martial artists
Bantamweight mixed martial artists
Featherweight mixed martial artists
Lightweight mixed martial artists
Living people
Year of birth missing (living people)
Mixed martial artists from New Jersey